The 1924 Rhode Island Rams football team was an American football team that represented Rhode Island State College (later renamed the University of Rhode Island) as a member of the New England Conference during the 1924 college football season. In its fifth season under head coach Frank Keaney, the team compiled a 0–7 record (0–3 against conference opponents) and finished in last place in the conference.

Schedule

References

Rhode Island State
Rhode Island Rams football seasons
College football winless seasons
Rhode Island State Rams football